Eric Chua Swee Leong  (born 1979) is a Singaporean politician who has been serving as Senior Parliamentary Secretary for Culture, Community and Youth and Senior Parliamentary Secretary for Social and Family Development concurrently since 2022. A member of the governing People's Action Party (PAP), he has been the Member of Parliament (MP) representing the Queenstown division of Tanjong Pagar GRC since 2020.

Prior to entering politics, Chua served in the Singapore Civil Defence Force (SCDF) and had been actively volunteering in grassroots activities with the People's Association (PA) in Tanjong Pagar GRC. 

He made his political debut in the 2020 general election as part of a five-member PAP team contesting in Tanjong Pagar GRC and won 63.13% of the vote.

Education 
A recipient of the Public Service Commission Local Merit Scholarship, Chua completed a bachelor's degree in communication studies at the Wee Kim Wee School of Communication and Information at Nanyang Technological University. For his postgraduate studies, he received a grant under the Fulbright Program and completed a master's degree in communication management at the Annenberg School for Communication and Journalism at the University of Southern California. He is also an elected member of the Phi Kappa Phi Honour Society for academic excellence.

Career

Civil career 
Chua had worked for 17 years in the Singapore Civil Defence Force (SCDF) and Ministry of Home Affairs. He held the rank of colonel in the SCDF and had served as head of operations of the 1st SCDF Division and commander of the 3rd SCDF Division. He was also the director of the SGSecure Programme Office.

Political career 
Chua was a grassroots volunteer in Tanjong Pagar GRC for 15 years, focusing on helping youths from poorer family backgrounds, and had been the Chairman of the People's Association Youth Movement's Central Youth Council. Chua received the Commendation Medal in 2017 and the Public Service Medal in 2019.

Chua was announced as a People's Action Party (PAP) candidate contesting as part of the five-member PAP team in Tanjong Pagar GRC during the 2020 general election. After the PAP team with 63.13% of the vote against the Progress Singapore Party, Chua became a Member of Parliament representing the Queenstown ward of Tanjong Pagar GRC.

On 27 July 2020, he was appointed Parliamentary Secretary at the Ministry of Social and Family Development and Ministry of Culture, Community and Youth. On 13 June 2022, Chua was promoted as Senior Parliamentary Secretary at the Ministry of Social and Family Development and Ministry of Culture, Community and Youth.

Personal life 
Chua is married and has one child. On 3 February 2022, Chua revealed he tested positive for COVID-19.

References 

1979 births
Living people
People's Action Party politicians
21st-century Singaporean politicians
Nanyang Technological University alumni
University of Southern California alumni
Members of the Parliament of Singapore